Hong Kong Blake Garden AA Ltd. (also known as HK Blake Garden AA or simply Blake Garden), is a football club in Hong Kong. As of 2011 it plays in the Hong Kong Third A Division League. It was formed by a group of football fans in Blake Garden, Hong Kong. It had competed in the Hong Kong First Division League.

History
In the 1970s, Blake Garden attracted lovers of football. A group of teenagers formed a team called Blake Garden. The team registered as a member of HKFA, and competed in Hong Kong Third Division League.

In the 1975-76 season, Blake Garden, as a team competing in Hong Kong Third Division League, reached the final of Hong Kong Junior Challenge Shield. Blake Garden defeated Hong Kong Second Division League club Jardine SA with a penalty goal and advanced to the Hong Kong Second Division League.

In the 1976-77 season, Blake Garden placed 2nd in the Second Division League, and promoted to the Hong Kong First Division League for the first time.

In the 1977-78 season, Blake Garden reached the final of the Hong Kong FA Cup, losing to Seiko SA.

In the 1978-79 season, during the match against Yuen Long District SA on 11 March 1978, players got in a fight. Blake Garden placed last that season and was relegated to the Second Division.

External links
 Club Information from HKFA

Football clubs in Hong Kong
1971 establishments in Hong Kong